The lesser kiskadee (Philohydor lictor) is a species of passerine bird in the family Tyrannidae. It is the only species in the genus Philohydor. It is found in Brazil, Bermuda, Bolivia, Argentina, Colombia, Ecuador, French Guiana, Guyana, Panama, Peru, Suriname, Trinidad, Guatemala, and Venezuela. Its natural habitats are subtropical or tropical moist shrubland and swamps.

The lesser kiskadee was described by the German naturalist and explorer Hinrich Lichtenstein in 1823 and given the binomial name Lanius lictor. The present genus Philohydor was introduced by the American ornithologist Wesley Edwin Lanyon in 1984. The word Philohydor is from Ancient Greek philos for "-loving" and hudōr, "water". The specific epithet lictor is the Latin word for a magistrate's bodyguard who carried out sentences.   It is sometimes placed in the genus Pitangus with the great kiskadee.

There are two subspecies:
 P. l. panamensis (Bangs & Penard, TE, 1918) – east Panama and north Colombia
 P. l. lictor (Lichtenstein, MHK, 1823) – east Colombia through the Guianas south to Bolivia, east and central Brazil

It lives in eastern Panama and throughout the northern parts of South America, usually near water.

References

Further reading

External links

 
Photo(bird on nest, forest), & Article Birds of Ecuador gallery at chandra.as.utexas.edu (photo)
 
 

lesser kiskadee
Birds of Panama
Birds of Brazil
Birds of Venezuela
Birds of the Guianas
Birds of the Amazon Basin
Birds of the Atlantic Forest
lesser kiskadee
Birds of Colombia
Taxonomy articles created by Polbot